Bring Me the Workhorse is the debut studio album from the American rock group My Brightest Diamond.

Content
The eleven-track album was released on vinyl, compact disc and digital download with Asthmatic Kitty Records, on 22 August 2006. It is produced and engineered by Worden, with additional engineering from Joel Shearer, mixed by Andrew Sheps, and mastered by Alan Douches. The album draws comparison to the music of PJ Harvey, Portishead's Beth Gibbons, and Björk. The song "The Robin's Jar" explores loss and childhood trauma, about a dead bird placed in a jar for it to be reborn, and as an analogy to the death of a loved one in adulthood.

Reception

A positive review from Pitchfork says that Worden "takes herself seriously, and such unapologetically dramatic material will make her a tough sell to indie fans who still hold irony and emotional detachment dear. It is, though, impossible to miss her confidence as a performer and it allows her to tread territory that would make others look clumsy, to string together multiple moments of beauty." On the album's lyrics and melodies, PopMatters notes the "wonderfully direct, true-in-the-best sense lines, apart from fitting the torch ballad mood like a blood-red evening dress, unmistakably illustrate My Brightest Diamond's method: the intersection of skillful direction and passionate conveyance." Consequence of Sound says that Worden "wastes no time in getting to the spooked heart of her subject matter, and Workhorse is an album littered with portentous phone calls, flies caught in webs and workhorses ready for the glue factory."

For the songs "Dragonfly," "Something of an End" and "We Were Sparkling," Slant writes "the operatic storytelling and codas of songs [which] finds Worden's trills emulating the sound of a ringing phone, reflect [her] classical training [and] the album's strings are sexy and cinematic, the guitars ominous, and Worden's vocals quiver quickly [over] the angelic choir which bleeds into the nostalgic sounds of a tinkling music box."

Track listing
All tracks are written by Shara Worden.

Personnel
Chris Bruce – bass
Earl Harvin – drums
Marla Hansen – viola
Maria Jeffers – cello
Rob Moose – violin
Zac Rae – keyboards on "Something of an End" and "Workhorse"
David Stith – prepared piano "Freak Out," backing vocals on "Disappear" and "Magic Rabbit," layout design and drawing
Shara Worden – lead & backing vocals, guitars, electric piano, celesta, organ, vibraphone, musical box, percussion, string arrangements, producer, engineer and artistic director
Barry Wright – trumpet on "The Good & the Bad Guy"
Keith Wright – accordion on "Gone Away"

Additional personnel
Alan Douches – mastering
Mikael Hines – assistant photographer
Katrina Kerns – make-up and hair stylist
Kevin McMahon – string engineer
Heather Morris – hair stylist
Joel Shearer – engineer
Andrew Sheps – mixing
Sarah Small – photography

References

Citations

Bibliography

External links

2006 debut albums
Asthmatic Kitty albums
My Brightest Diamond albums